Lars Erik Mikael Martinsson (born 29 March 1966) is a Swedish former footballer who played as a forward. He played for Vasalunds IF, CD Castellón, Djurgårdens IF, IFK Göteborg and IF Elfsborg. He made six appearances for the Sweden national football team

References

Swedish footballers
Sweden international footballers
Swedish expatriate footballers
Allsvenskan players
Segunda División players
Vasalunds IF players
Djurgårdens IF Fotboll players
IFK Göteborg players
IF Elfsborg players
CD Castellón footballers
Expatriate footballers in Spain
1966 births
Living people
Association football forwards